Manyema (WaManyema) (Una-Ma-Nyema, eaters of flesh) are a powerful and, in the past, warlike Bantu people  in the southeast of the Congo basin in Nyangwe (Kasongo) in Maniema, Democratic Republic of Congo and in the city of Kigoma, Kigoma region of Western Tanzania around the shores of Lake Tanganyika.

Manyema, like the Nyamwezi, are descendants of porters during the height of the Arab trade in the Sultanate of Utetera

Indeed, the area was for the greater part of the 19th century an Eldorado of the Arab slave raiders.

WaSwahili in Ujiji town on the border between Tanzania & Democratic Republic of Congo, many of whom originally Manyema from central Congo, also identify themselves WaSwahili (a Bantu, Afro-Arab and Comorian ethnic group).

In Tanzania, the Manyema includes various smaller tribes which are independent culturally but with some resemblance due to intermarriages include the Wagoma, Wabwari (ethnic group from Zaïre, now the Democratic Republic of Congo originating from Lake Tanganyika), Wabuyu (Eastern Pende), Wamasanze, Bangubangu (Eastern Luba), Wabembe (Eastern Mongo): all originally descending from Congo.

See also
 Swahili people 
 Tippu Tip
 Kasongo
 Nyangwe
 Sultanate of Zanzibar
 Sultanate of Utetera
 Congo–Arab War
 Congo Free State

References

Bantu peoples
Ethnic groups in Tanzania